Sophie Tamiko Oda (born October 23, 1991) is an American actress and singer. She was nominated in 2007 by the Young Artist Awards as a guest starring young actress.

Personal life
Oda, a Japanese American, was born in San Francisco, California. She is also a professional singer and performs frequently in concerts and benefits. Some of her performances are the Japanese American Hall of Fame, Theatre Works 35th Anniversary, Asian Americans on Broadway, Multi-Media Musicals, East West Players Anniversary, MADD, Bay Area Kid Fest. She is a featured singer on the CD, Kabaret for Kids.

Oda has been performing in professional theatre since the age of six. Shows include The 25th Annual Putnam County Spelling Bee, the World Premiere of A Little Princess, the West Coast Premiere of Jane Eyre, the Musical, The Sound of Music, Pacific Overtures, Annie, The Joy Luck Club, A Midsummer Night's Dream, South Pacific, The King and I, and more.

Oda graduated from the University of California, Irvine in 2012 with a B.F.A in Musical Theatre.

Career
Oda had a recurring role in The Suite Life of Zack & Cody as Barbara Brownstein. She appeared in two movies: Bee Season and Kung Phooey. Sophie has been a singer on Star Search. She has been a guest star in the latest sitcom, The Suite Life on Deck, with her recurring role as Barbara. Sophie is starring in a comedy web series called Spaz Fu.

Filmography

Awards and nominations

References

External links
 
 Diablomag.com

1991 births
21st-century American actresses
Actresses from San Francisco
American child actresses
American actresses of Japanese descent
American television actresses
Living people
University of California, Irvine alumni